Asadullah (born 5 November 2000) is an Afghan cricketer. He made his first-class debut for Mis Ainak Region in the 2018 Ahmad Shah Abdali 4-day Tournament on 1 April 2018. He made his List A debut for Mis Ainak Region in the 2018 Ghazi Amanullah Khan Regional One Day Tournament on 13 July 2018.

References

External links
 

2000 births
Living people
Afghan cricketers
Mis Ainak Knights cricketers
Place of birth missing (living people)